Born Yesterday is a 1956 TV film based on the play Born Yesterday by Garson Kanin for the Hallmark Hall of Fame. Kanin adapted and directed it. George Schaefer helped Kanin direct but was not credited.

Mary Martin's performance was her first TV appearance since Peter Pan. The New York Times thought she was miscast.

Cast
Mary Martin as Billie Dawn
Paul Douglas as Harry Brock
Arthur Hill as Paul Verrall

References

External links
Born Yesterday at IMDb

1956 television films
1956 films